Santa Maria della Consolazione is a Roman Catholic church in Rome, Italy at the foot of the Palatine Hill, in rione Campitelli.

History
The church is named after an icon of the Virgin Mary which was placed on this site to console criminals who were tossed down off the cliff above the church, thought to be the Tarpeian Rock from where condemned Ancient Roman criminals were tossed to their death in Roman times. In 1385 a condemned nobleman, Giordanello degli Alberini, paid 2 gold florins for the icon to provide consolation for criminals facing death.

Architecture and art

A church originally was built here in 1470, but rebuilt during 1583–1600 by Martino Longhi the Elder, during which time the Mannerist façade was installed. The tympanum was completed in 1827 by Pasquale Belli.

The first chapel on the right has frescoes of Scenes of the Passion (1556) by Taddeo Zuccari. The second chapel on has a Madonna with Child and Saints (1575) by Livio Agresti. The third chapel on the right has a Story of Jesus and Virgin by Giovanni Baglione. The chapel to the right of the presbytery has an icon of the Virgin from the 13th century. The altar, designed by Martino Longhi, has a fresco copy of the 14th century Madonna della Consolazione, repainted by Antoniazzo Romano. The walls of the presbytery are frescoed with a Nativity and an Assumption by Niccolò Circignani (il Pomarancio), who also painted the Scenes of the Life of Mary and Jesus in the fifth chapel. The 4th chapel to the left has frescoes on the Life of St. Andrew by Marzio Colantonio Ganassini. In the 3rd chapel on the left, are frescoes of scenes from the Life of the Virgin by Francesco Nappi; the 2nd chapel on the left has a St Francis receives the Stigmata of the 17th century; the 1st chapel has a Mystical Marriage of St Catherine (c. 1530), and a marble relief by Raffaello da Montelupo.

References

External links

 Panoramic view of interior.
 Romecity entry

Roman Catholic churches completed in 1600
16th-century Roman Catholic church buildings in Italy
Maria
Mannerist architecture in Italy
1600 establishments in Italy
Churches of Rome (rione Campitelli)